Delta Lake is a freshwater lake located in the Alpine Lakes Wilderness, north of the Necklace Valley lakes in King County, Washington. Because Delta lake is at the heart of the Alpine Lakes Wilderness, the lake is a popular area for hiking, swimming, and fishing rainbow trout, and cutthroat trout. Delta Lake is a consequence of the spill of the outlets of three major Alpine Lakes: Otter Lake, Big Heart Lake, and Angeline Lake. The West Fork of the Foss River exits Delta Lake in two outlets which merge into one stream shortly above the top of Upper Foss River Falls.

Waterfalls
Delta Lake is surrounded by forested slopes and, unlike its neighbor lakes, it laks the characteristic talus, and avalanche tracks. Self-issued Alpine Lake Wilderness permit required for transit around Delta Lake and within the neighboring Necklace Valley area. A prominent delta flows into Delta Lake formed by the West Fork Foss River and other streams from Big Heart Lakes.

See also 
 List of lakes of the Alpine Lakes Wilderness

References 

Lakes of King County, Washington
Lakes of the Alpine Lakes Wilderness
Okanogan National Forest